Corbie Hill is a small locality south-east of Leeton, New South Wales, Australia in Leeton Shire. It can be accessed by Corbie Hill Road which links to the Irrigation Way at Gralee.

The Leeton Landfill & Recycling Depot is located in Corbie Hill.

References

Leeton Shire
Towns in New South Wales